Carasobarbus fritschii is a species of ray-finned fish in the  family Cyprinidae.
It is found only in the upper parts of the rivers of Morocco.
Its natural habitat is rivers.

References

Carasobarbus
Endemic fauna of Morocco
Freshwater fish of North Africa
Fish described in 1874
Taxa named by Albert Günther
Taxonomy articles created by Polbot